William Hayes was a professional rugby league footballer who played in the 1930s and 1940s.

Playing career

County League appearances
William Hayes played in Castleford's victories in the Yorkshire County League during the 1932–33 season, and 1938–39 season.

Club career
William Hayes made his début for Featherstone Rovers on Saturday 9 January 1932.

References

External links
Search for "Hayes" at rugbyleagueproject.org
Hayes Memory Box Search at archive.castigersheritage.com

Castleford Tigers players
English rugby league players
Featherstone Rovers players
Place of birth missing
Place of death missing
Rugby league five-eighths
Rugby league halfbacks
Year of birth missing
Year of death missing